Buxton Peters (born 1924, date of death unknown) was a Trinidadian cricketer. He played in four first-class matches for Trinidad and Tobago from 1955 to 1960.

See also
 List of Trinidadian representative cricketers

References

External links
 

1924 births
Year of death missing
Trinidad and Tobago cricketers